Velike Dole pri Temenici is a small settlement in the Municipality of Ivančna Gorica in central Slovenia. The area is part of the historical region of Lower Carniola. The municipality is now included in the Central Slovenia Statistical Region.

Name
The name of the settlement was changed from Velike Dole to Velike Dole pri Šentjurju in 1953. The name was changed again to Velike Dole pri Temenici in 1997. In the past the German name was Großdule.

History
Archaeological evidence shows the area was already settled in the Late Bronze Age.

References

External links
Velike Dole pri Temenici on Geopedia

Populated places in the Municipality of Ivančna Gorica